Meru is a 2015 documentary film chronicling the first ascent of the "Shark's Fin" route on Meru Peak in the Indian Himalayas. It was co-directed by married couple Jimmy Chin and Elizabeth Chai Vasarhelyi and won the U.S. Audience Documentary Award at the 2015 Sundance Film Festival.

Premise
After attempting but failing to summit Meru in 2008, Conrad Anker, Jimmy Chin, and Renan Ozturk return to the mountain in order to conquer its peak – a 4,000 foot wall known as the "Shark's Fin". As they climb, the men also document their ascent. "You know, I'm always a climber first," said Chin on balancing climbing with filmmaking. "I'm always thinking about the safety of myself and the team. And I make that evaluation before I take the camera out." The film is a mixture of footage that chronicles both attempts (the failed 2008 and the successful 2011) while crafting a narrative about the climbers' attempts to face their demons. After suffering an horrific accident while filming on location with Chin, Ozturk has a mere five months to recover before their second attempt, battling near-fatal injuries. Four days after Ozturk's accident, Chin returns to the filming location to finish but is caught in a catastrophic avalanche that he miraculously survives with barely a scratch. Anker wrestles with bringing his mentor's dream to fruition and the loss of both him and his climbing partner many years ago. During the successful 2011 summit, Chin and Ozturk shared a Canon 5D Mark II and a Panasonic TM900 camcorder to capture footage that would be used in the film.

Reception
On review aggregation website Rotten Tomatoes, Meru has an approval rating of 90% based on 73 reviews, with a rating average score of 7.4 out of 10. The site's consensus reads, "Gripping visually as well as narratively, Meru is the rare documentary that proves thought-provoking while offering thrilling wide-screen vistas." On Metacritic, which assigns a normalized rating, the film has a score of 77 out of 100 based on reviews from 15 critics, indicating "generally favorable reviews".

The film made $91,279 from 7 theaters in its opening weekend. It expanded to 35 theaters in its second weekend, making $562,786. During its fifth weekend, it earned $416,701 from 176 theaters, bringing the total box office gross to $2,334,228.

On December 1, the film was selected as one of 15 shortlisted for the Academy Award for Best Documentary Feature.

Awards
Golden Piton by Climbing Magazine for Best Big Wall Climb of the Year
Number 1 ascent of the year by Rock and Ice Magazine
U.S. Audience Documentary Award at the 2015 Sundance Film Festival

See also

 List of films shot over three or more years

References

External links
 
 

2015 films
2015 documentary films
Films directed by Elizabeth Chai Vasarhelyi
Films directed by Jimmy Chin
Films shot in India
Avalanches in film
Mountaineering films
Documentary films about climbing
Films set in Uttarakhand
2010s English-language films